Tilak Maharashtra Vidyapeeth is a deemed university (vidyapeeth) in Pune, Maharashtra, India. It was established in 1921, and named after the Indian independence movement activist — Bal Gangadhar Tilak.

References

External links
Tilak Maharashtra University

Deemed universities in Maharashtra
Universities and colleges in Pune
Universities in Maharashtra
Memorials to Bal Gangadhar Tilak
Educational institutions established in 1921
1921 establishments in India